Valea Măgurii River may refer to:

 Valea Măgurii, a tributary of the Dâmbovița in Argeș County, Romania
 Valea Măgurii, a tributary of the Valea lui Vasile in Bihor County, Romania